The Association des Audionautes is a French lobby group founded by Aziz Ridouan, Quentin Renaudo and Jean-Baptiste Soufron in October 2004 that supports Internet users sharing files, including copyrighted material, over peer-to-peer networks.

It provides legal information to Internet users accused of copyright infringement.

It lobbies for the establishment of a "legal licence" for peer-to-peer users, whereby they would be immune to prosecution for copyright infringement as long as their trading is noncommercial and they pay a flat fee, which would be distributed to artists and producers as are other similar fees (on blank media, or for radio and TV uses).

See DADVSI.

References

External links
 Official site 
 Official blog - English section

Politics of France
Political advocacy groups in France
Intellectual property activism
Organizations established in 2004
Copyright law organizations
2004 establishments in France